Charles Thomas Kennedy,  (6 January 1873 – 24 April 1907) was a Scottish recipient of the Victoria Cross, the highest and most prestigious award for gallantry in the face of the enemy that can be awarded to British and Commonwealth forces.

Details
Kennedy was 27 years, and a private in the 1st Battalion, The Highland Light Infantry, British Army during the Second Boer War when the following deed took place at Dewetsdorp, South Africa for which he was awarded the VC.

Kennedy received the Victoria Cross from King Edward VII at an impressive investiture held at St James's Palace on 17 December 1901. He had, by now, returned to England and been posted to the 2nd Battalion, The Highland Light Infantry. He subsequently failed to meet the Army's physical requirements owing to his wound and was discharged from the Service on 25 June 1902.  He then returned to Edinburgh, but was fatally injured in 1907, when a horse bolted in Leith Walk, and its cart threatened the lives of passers-by. He died between Brunswick Road and the Infirmary.

Further information
He is buried in North Merchiston Cemetery, Edinburgh, the city in which he was born. He has since had a street in Fountainbridge where he was brought up named in his honour and a bench placed in the Grassmarket area, again, near where he lived as a boy.

The medal
His Victoria Cross is displayed at the Museum of The Royal Highland Fusiliers, Glasgow, Scotland.

See also

List of Scottish Victoria Cross recipients

References

Monuments to Courage (David Harvey, 1999)
The Register of the Victoria Cross (This England, 1997)
Scotland's Forgotten Valour (Graham Ross, 1995)
Victoria Crosses of the Anglo-Boer War (Ian Uys, 2000)
Shilling Extra (Barbara Kennedy, Peter Kennedy, 2010)

External links
Location of grave and VC medal (Edinburgh)

Victoriacross.org

1873 births
1907 deaths
Military personnel from Edinburgh
Second Boer War recipients of the Victoria Cross
British recipients of the Victoria Cross
Highland Light Infantry soldiers
British Army personnel of the Second Boer War
British military personnel of the Malakand Frontier War
Road incident deaths in Scotland
British Army recipients of the Victoria Cross
Deaths by horse-riding accident in Scotland